Chronological listing of the battles of the Battles of the Russo-Turkish War (1877–1878)

List of Battles
Key: (R) – Russian victory; (O) – Ottoman victory; (I) – Inconclusive

1877
 June 26 – Battle of Simnitza; Russians begin crossing the Danube River (R)
 June 26 – Battle of Svistov; Russians reduce fortress and move on to Nikopol (R)
 July 12 - Battle of Elena I (O)
 July 16 – Battle of Nikopol; Russians move into Bulgaria (R)
 July 17 – Battle of Shipka Pass I; Russians capture Shipka Pass (R)
 July 20 – Siege of Plevna begins (R)
 July 20 - First battle of Plevna Ottomans repulse the Russian attack (O)
 July 31 - Second battle of Plevna Ottomans repulse the Russian attack (O)
 August 21 – Battle of Shipka Pass II; Russians repulse Ottoman attack on Shipka Pass (R)
 August 25 – Battle of Kızıl Tepe; Russian attempt at besieging Kars is driven off (O)
 September 3 – Battle of Lovcha; Russians reduce during the siege of Plevna (R)
 September 11 - Third battle of Plevna Ottomans repulse the Russian attack (O)
 September 13 – Battle of Shipka Pass III; Russians repulse second Ottoman attack on Shipka Pass (R)
 October 2/4 – Battle of Yahni; The Russians made some gains but were not able to hold them (O)
 October 12/15 – Battle of Aladzha; Ottoman army under Hadji Resit Pasha surrenders (R)
 October 24 – Battle of Gorni Dubnik; Russians capture Turkish redoubt guarding Plevna supply lines (R)
 November 4 – Battle of Deve Boyun; Russian general Heimann won a further battle (R)
 November 8/9 – Battle of Erzurum; Russians fail to capture Erzurum in an attack (O)
 November 17 – Battle of Kars; Russians seize Ottoman fortress in the Caucasus region (R)
 December 4 - Battle of Elena II (O)
 December 10 – Plevna capitulates to Russia (R)
 December 14 - Battle of Elena III (R)
 December 31 – Battle of Tashkessen; covering the general withdrawal, Turks briefly check Russian advance (O)

1878
 January 4 – Battle of Sofia: General Gourko liberates Sofia from Turkish rule (R)
 January 5 – Battle of Shipka Pass IV; General Gourko crushes Turks at Shipka Pass (R)
 January 17 – Battle of Philippopolis; Gourko routes Turkish forces and moves to within striking distance of Istanbul (R)

See also
 History of Russo-Turkish wars